Zon or van Zon may refer the following notable people:
Given name
Zon Moe Aung (born 1993), association football player from Burma
Zon Murray (1910–1979), American actor

Surname
 Fadli Zon (born 1971), Indonesian politician
 Jacques Zon (1872–1932), Dutch painter
 Kelly van Zon (born 1987), Dutch table tennis player
Leonard I. Zon, American medical researcher
 Raphael Zon (1874–1956), U.S. Forest Service researcher

See also
Zoon (disambiguation)
Zohn